Subbiah Arunan  is an Indian scientist and Padma Shri awardee, known for his role in the Mars Orbiter Mission of Indian Space Research Organisation (ISRO). He finished his schooling in St. Mary's Higher Secondary School, Vikramasingapuram in Tirunelveli Dist. He was born in Kothaiseri, Tirunelveli district, Tamil Nadu and completed his Mechanical engineering from Coimbatore Institute of Technology. In 1984, he started his career in Vikram Sarabhai Space Centre. He is the project director of Mars Orbiter Mission, informally called Mangalyaan in 2013. He is married to Geetha Arunan, the daughter of fellow ISRO scientist Nambi Narayanan.

References

Living people
Indian aerospace engineers
Indian Space Research Organisation people
Scientists from Tamil Nadu
Recipients of the Padma Shri in science & engineering
People from Tirunelveli district
20th-century Indian engineers
Year of birth missing (living people)